Mary Berry Cooks is a factual food programme which currently airs on BBC Two and is hosted by Mary Berry.

Episode Guide

Book
The official Mary Berry Cooks recipe book was released on 27 February 2014.

International broadcast
 — Mary Berry Cooks premiered on Lifestyle Food on 9 January 2015.

References

External links
 

2014 British television series debuts
2014 British television series endings
2010s British cooking television series
British cooking television shows
English-language television shows
BBC Television shows